Nowshahr-e Kalangi (also Romanized as Nowshahr-e Kalangī) is a village in Sirik Rural District, Byaban District, Minab County, Hormozgan Province, Iran. At the 2006 census, its population was 333, in 50 families.

References 

Populated places in Minab County